Adelaide Metcalfe (2016 population 2,990) is a township in Middlesex County, Ontario, Canada. It was formed on January 1, 2001 through the amalgamation of the former Township of Adelaide and the Township of Metcalfe. It is part of the London census metropolitan area.

Communities
The township contains the communities of Adelaide, Crathie, Dejong, Kerwood, Keyser, Mullifarry, Napier, Napperton, Springfield, Walkers and Wrightmans Corners.  The administrative offices of the township are in the locality of Adelaide.

Demographics

According to the 2011 Canadian Census, the median age was 39.7 years old which is approximately the same as the national average at 40.6 years old.

Residents of Adelaide Metcalfe are primarily White, with a small community of Koreans. Specifically, residents of Adelaide Metcalfe identify their ethnic origin as: 
Canadian,
English,
Dutch,
Scottish, and
Irish. Adelaide Metcalfe has  Christian adherents whereas  does not affiliate with any religion.

The median household income before taxes is $28,644, and after taxes is $26,846; lower than the provincial or national figures at $66,358 and $61,072 pre-tax ($58,717 and $54,089 after tax) respectively. The median commute time to work for those 15 years and over was 20.3 minutes with almost all commutes done by personal vehicle as a driver. The median value of a dwelling in Adelaide Metcalfe is $250,399 which is less than the Canadian median value of $280,552 and the Ontario median value of $300,862.

Government

The Township is led by a Council with a mayor and four councillors.  The current council was elected in 2018 along with all other municipal elections in Ontario, and the next election will be in 2022.  The members of the current council are:
Mayor:  Kurtis Smith
Councillors:  Betty Ann MacKinnon, Mary Ann Hendrikx, Mike Brodie, Sue Clarke

Notes

See also
 List of municipalities in Ontario
List of townships in Ontario

References

External links

Township municipalities in Ontario
Lower-tier municipalities in Ontario
Municipalities in Middlesex County, Ontario